Mahbubey Alam (17 February 1949 – 27 September 2020) was a Bangladeshi politician, designated senior counsel, and Attorney General of Bangladesh. He was appointed attorney general on 13 January 2009. He was a senior advocate at the Supreme Court of Bangladesh. He had served earlier as additional attorney general from 15 November 1998 to 4 October 2001.

Biography
Alam was born in Mouchhamandra village in Louhajang in Munshiganj on 17 February 1949. He  studied at University of Dhaka, obtaining his Bachelor of Arts in Political Science (1968), Master of Arts in Public Administration (1969), and LL.B degree (1972). He also attained diplomas in constitutional law and parliamentary institutions and procedures in 1979 from the Institute of Constitutional and Parliamentary Studies (ICPS) in New Delhi.

He began his law career at the High Court Division of the Supreme Court of Bangladesh in January 1975 and became a lawyer of the Bangladesh Supreme Court, Appellate Division in 1980. He was the Chairman of the Bangladesh Bar Council from 13 January 2009 to 30 June 2018. He was Additional Attorney General for Bangladesh from 15 November 1998 to 4 October 2001. He was Attorney General of Bangladesh from 13 January 2009 until his death in 2020.

Death
Mahbubey Alam was admitted to Combined Military Hospital on 4 September 2020 after being diagnosed with COVID-19 during the COVID-19 pandemic in Bangladesh and died on 27 September. A Namaz-e-Janaza was held at the Supreme Court on 28 September 2020, and Alam was buried at Mirpur Martyred Intellectual Graveyard.

References

1949 births
2020 deaths
People from Munshiganj District
University of Dhaka alumni
20th-century Bangladeshi lawyers
Attorneys General of Bangladesh
Deaths from the COVID-19 pandemic in Bangladesh
21st-century Bangladeshi lawyers
Burials at Mirpur Martyred Intellectual Graveyard